Edward Robert Ronan (born March 21, 1968) is an American former professional hockey player, who played in the National Hockey League (NHL) for the Montreal Canadiens, Winnipeg Jets and Buffalo Sabres.

Ronan won the Stanley Cup in 1993 with the Montreal Canadiens. He also played for the Fredericton Canadiens, Springfield Falcons, Rochester Americans, and Providence Bruins of the AHL. Before starting his professional career he played four seasons for Boston University.

Regular season and playoffs

External links

1968 births
Living people
American men's ice hockey right wingers
Boston University Terriers men's ice hockey players
Buffalo Sabres players
Fredericton Canadiens players
Ice hockey players from Massachusetts
Montreal Canadiens draft picks
Montreal Canadiens players
Sportspeople from Quincy, Massachusetts
Providence Bruins players
Rochester Americans players
Springfield Falcons players
Stanley Cup champions
Winnipeg Jets (1979–1996) players